The Deputy Chair of the NATO Military Committee (DCMC) is the deputy head of the NATO Military Committee. Originally titled as the Deputy Chairman, the post was redesignated in 2021 to reflect the gender-neutrality of the post.

The current Deputy Chair of the NATO Military Committee is U.S. Air Force Lieutenant General Lance K. Landrum. He is the 23rd Deputy Chair and took office on October 11, 2021.

Role
The DCMC assists the Chair, advises the Deputy Secretary General and serves as the principal agent for coordination of nuclear, biological, and chemical matters for the Military Committee. Finally, in the Chair's absence, the Deputy Chair directs the daily operations and business of the Military Committee, NATO's highest military authority.

The Deputy Chair, always a US general or flag officer, provides a particular and ideal vantage point to serve the Alliance's Transatlantic bond.  Having unique and relevant access to U.S. nuclear information coupled with an intimate relationship with NATO's 29 members offers distinctive opportunities to provide best military advice, especially pertaining to nuclear matters.  While being a U.S. officer, the individual serves in an international capacity to represent the interests of the Alliance.

History
A Chairman position was initially established without a Deputy, but as the command structure evolved and the demands on the Chairman increased, the need for a Deputy became obvious.

The Deputy's origins come from within the structure of the International Military Staff (IMS) as the 1963 Military Committee reforms provided the Director of the IMS a vice-director who held "special responsibilities for nuclear matters." This office was always an American to link the United States and NATO in nuclear strategy. Two dynamics served as the catalyst to establish the Deputy Chairman position on the Military Committee as it reflects today: 1. When the Chairman was away from Brussels, using a Military Representative within the Military Committee as a substitute proved unviable due to the conflict of simultaneously representing the interests of the Military Committee at large and one's own national interests and 2. the Military Committee did not want to create additional high-ranking officer positions to resolve the first issue. As a solution, the Military Committee elected to eliminate the Vice Director of the IMS position and simultaneously establish a new post of Deputy Chairman of the Military Committee.  The Deputy position would still maintain the special responsibility for nuclear matters and remain a U.S. officer as established for the Vice-Director position.  The NAC approved the proposal on January 6, 1967, to formally establish the position of Deputy Chairman of the Military Committee.

List
Since the establishment of the Deputy Chairman position in 1967, there have been 9 from the Air Force, 5 from the Army, 4 from the Navy, and 2 from the Marine Corps. The deputy chairs have been:

See also
Chairman of the NATO Military Committee
NATO Military Committee
Chairman of the European Union Military Committee
International Military Staff
Supreme Allied Commander Europe

References

Further reading 
Douglas S. Bland, 'The Military Committee of the North Atlantic Alliance: A Study of Structure and Strategy,' New York, Praeger, 1991.

NATO military appointments
NATO Military Committee